Jefferson Township is the name of twenty-eight townships in the U.S. state of Indiana:

 Jefferson Township, Adams County, Indiana
 Jefferson Township, Allen County, Indiana
 Jefferson Township, Boone County, Indiana
 Jefferson Township, Carroll County, Indiana
 Jefferson Township, Cass County, Indiana
 Jefferson Township, Dubois County, Indiana
 Jefferson Township, Elkhart County, Indiana
 Jefferson Township, Grant County, Indiana
 Jefferson Township, Greene County, Indiana
 Jefferson Township, Henry County, Indiana
 Jefferson Township, Huntington County, Indiana
 Jefferson Township, Jay County, Indiana
 Jefferson Township, Kosciusko County, Indiana
 Jefferson Township, Miami County, Indiana
 Jefferson Township, Morgan County, Indiana
 Jefferson Township, Newton County, Indiana
 Jefferson Township, Noble County, Indiana
 Jefferson Township, Owen County, Indiana
 Jefferson Township, Pike County, Indiana
 Jefferson Township, Pulaski County, Indiana
 Jefferson Township, Putnam County, Indiana
 Jefferson Township, Sullivan County, Indiana
 Jefferson Township, Switzerland County, Indiana
 Jefferson Township, Tipton County, Indiana
 Jefferson Township, Washington County, Indiana
 Jefferson Township, Wayne County, Indiana
 Jefferson Township, Wells County, Indiana
 Jefferson Township, Whitley County, Indiana

Indiana township disambiguation pages